The list of shipwrecks in February 1877 includes ships sunk, foundered, grounded, or otherwise lost during February 1877.

1 February

2 February

3 February

4 February

5 February

21 February

22 February

23 February

24 February

25 February

26 February

27 February

28 February

Unknown date

References
Notes

References

Bibliography
Ingram, C. W. N., and Wheatley, P. O., (1936) Shipwrecks: New Zealand disasters 1795–1936. Dunedin, NZ: Dunedin Book Publishing Association.

1877-02
Maritime incidents in February 1877